Trans-Namib Railroad Museum is a museum in Windhoek. It is located in Windhoek Railway Station's building, and was established on 1 July 1993. The museum displays items such as railway equipment and maps, as well as artifacts relating to aviation and seafaring.

References 

Railway museums in Namibia
Museums established in 1993
1993 establishments in Namibia
Buildings and structures in Windhoek
Tourist attractions in Namibia